Pagoh is a suburb in Muar District, Johor, Malaysia.

Pagoh may also refer to:
Pagoh (federal constituency), represented in the Dewan Rakyat